Koriak Upaiga (born 13 June 1987) is a Papua New Guinean footballer who plays as a defender for PRK Hekari United.

International career

International goals
Scores and results list Papua New Guinea's goal tally first.

References 

1987 births
Living people
Papua New Guinean footballers
Association football midfielders
Hekari United players
Sunshine Coast F.C. players
2012 OFC Nations Cup players
2016 OFC Nations Cup players
Papua New Guinean expatriate footballers
Papua New Guinean expatriate sportspeople in Australia
Expatriate soccer players in Australia
People from the Western Highlands Province
Papua New Guinea international footballers
Marist F.C. players